The 25th International Film Festival of India was held during 10-20 January 1994 at Kolkata.

The festival was made interim non-competitive following a decision taken in August 1988 by the Ministry of Information and Broadcasting.

Non-Competitive Sections
Cinema of The World
Indian Panorama - Feature Films
Indian Panorama - Non-Feature Films
Indian Panorama - Mainstream Films

References

1994 film festivals
25th
1994 in Indian cinema